Surgicel is a hemostatic agent (blood-clot-inducing material) made of an oxidized cellulose polymer (the unit is polyanhydroglucuronic acid), manufactured by the Ethicon subsidiary of Johnson And Johnson. It was introduced into clinical practice in 1947. It is used to control post-surgical bleeding. It is also used by some boxing cutmen to control bleeding.

Surgicel is used extensively in oral and maxillofacial surgery to control intrabony arterial bleeds from the inferior alveolar artery.  It is frequently used to stop bleeding following newborn circumcision if pressure alone is inadequate. When placed in the mandibular canal with the inferior alveolar nerve exposed there have been reports of neurotoxic effects.

Common sizes include:

References
 Surgicel at Johnson and Johnson
 Surgicel in the management of epistaxis 1947

Antihemorrhagics